The 1928 Washington gubernatorial election was held on November 6, 1928. Incumbent Republican Roland H. Hartley defeated Democratic nominee A. Scott Bullitt with 56.22% of the vote.

Primary elections
Primary elections were held on September 11, 1928.

Democratic primary

Candidates 
A. Scott Bullitt, attorney from Seattle
Stephen James Chadwick, former Associate Justice of the Washington Supreme Court
C. L. McKenzie
George F. Cotterill, former Mayor of Seattle

Results

Republican primary

Candidates
Roland H. Hartley, incumbent Governor
E. L. French
Claude G. Bannick

Results

General election

Candidates
Major party candidates
Roland H. Hartley, Republican 
A. Scott Bullitt, Democratic

Other candidates
James F. Stark, Socialist Labor
Walter Price, Socialist
Aaron Fislerman, Workers

Results

Notes

References

1928
Washington
Gubernatorial